Ryan Jones (born 2 April 1992) is an English footballer who plays a goalkeeper.

Career
After several stints with Rochdale, Telford United and Northwich Victoria, Jones signed with USL Pro club Richmond Kickers, making him the youngest player in club history. On 14 August 2011, Jones made his debut for Richmond in a 0-0 draw on the road against Los Angeles Blues.

On 12 January 2012, he signed for North West Counties Premier Division side Bacup Borough on loan. He made his debut for the club nine days later in a 1–0 loss to Stone Dominoes. He later played for Bootle in the same season.

He was released by Richmond in August 2013 to allow him to return to England.

On 28 August 2013, he signed for Stockport County on non-contract terms replacing Lewis King who left the club two days prior. He saved a penalty in his debut for Stockport in their 4–2 home win against Telford United.

In January 2014, AFC Liverpool signed Jones. During his time with the club he was awarded the "Player of the month" award in August 2014.

In March 2016 he rejoined Bootle before signing dual registration forms with Bradford Park Avenue and playing seven games for them at the end of the season.

In July after playing pre-season games, he signed a permanent transfer to Bradford Park Avenue before in September 2016 he rejoined Bootle.

At the beginning of the 2017 season he appeared for Radcliffe Borough.

References

External links
 
 Richmond Kickers bio

1992 births
Living people
Association football goalkeepers
English footballers
English expatriate footballers
Rochdale A.F.C. players
AFC Telford United players
Northwich Victoria F.C. players
Richmond Kickers players
Bacup Borough F.C. players
USL Championship players
Expatriate soccer players in the United States
Footballers from Liverpool
Stockport County F.C. players
A.F.C. Liverpool players
Bootle F.C. players
Bradford (Park Avenue) A.F.C. players
Radcliffe F.C. players
English expatriate sportspeople in the United States
North West Counties Football League players